Cranaothus deforgesi is a species of crabs in the family Xanthidae, the only species in the genus Cranaothus.

References

Xanthoidea
Monotypic decapod genera